USRC Algonquin was an Algonquin-class cutter built for the U.S. Revenue Cutter Service for service on the Great Lakes. Because of the Spanish–American War, she was cut in half shortly before completion and transported to Ogdensburg, New York for service on the Atlantic coast although the war ended before she could be put into service. She was homeported at San Juan, Puerto Rico from 1905 to 1917. After the formation of the United States Coast Guard in 1915 she became USCGC Algonquin. She served as a patrol vessel at Norfolk, Virginia at the beginning of World War I before being assigned convoy duty in the Mediterranean. In February 1919 she was transferred to the West Coast and served in the Pacific Northwest and Alaska.

Construction
The United States Revenue Cutter Service cutter Algonquin was planned and designed by RCS officers and laid down in 1897 at the Globe Iron Workss yard in Cleveland (yard number 71) and launched on 30 March 1897.  She was a steel-hulled vessel equipped with a triple-expansion steam engine, Scotch boilers, and a single screw. She was one of the first RCS cutters built with electric generators to supply current for lights and call bells. She was one of the last RCS cutters that was rigged for sails and had a bow torpedo tube installed. Before Algonquin could be completed, she was transferred to U.S. Navy control on 24 March 1898 because of growing hostilities with Spain. The contractor was directed to cut the ship in half for transport to Ogdensburg, New York. She was reassembled at Montreal, Canada and was in the Revenue Cutter Service's shipyard at Arundel Cove, Curtis Bay, Maryland when war broke out between the United States and Spain on 6 April 1917. Algonquin was finally accepted for service and commissioned 20 June 1918 at Ogdensburg and ordered to report for duty at Boston, Massachusetts. She was returned to Department of the Treasury control on 17 August at the conclusion of hostilities with Spain.

History

1899–1917
On 9 September 1898, Algonquin was ordered to Philadelphia and thereafter to the Delaware Breakwater to receive a gun from USRC Levi Woodbury. In December, winter sailing orders were issued with Algonquin ordered to cruise from Norfolk, Virginia to New York and from Norfolk to Cape Hatteras. On 19 January 1899 she was ordered to sail for Havana, Cuba to tow a barge bound for the Marine Hospital Service. She made several port calls before ultimately arriving at Havana on 1 March. She arrived at back at Norfolk on 23 March.

Winter sailing orders for 1900 sent Algonquin to Wilmington, North Carolina for instructions to cruise the area from Cape Hatteras to Charleston, South Carolina. On 5 May 1900, she was ordered to search for the crew of the shipwrecked British steamer Virginia.

Notes

Citations

References

 
 
 
 
  No ISBN 
 
  

Patrol vessels of the United States
Cutters of the United States Navy
Ships of the United States Revenue Cutter Service
Ships of the United States Coast Guard
1898 ships
World War I patrol vessels of the United States
Ships built in Cleveland